Tachyrhynchus erosus, common name the eroded turretsnail, is a species of sea snail, a marine gastropod mollusk in the family Turritellidae.

Distribution

Description 
The maximum recorded shell length is 35 mm.

Habitat 
Minimum recorded depth is 13 m. Maximum recorded depth is 457 m.

References

Turritellidae
Gastropods described in 1838